Serine/threonine-protein phosphatase 2A regulatory subunit B'' subunit alpha is an enzyme that in humans is encoded by the PPP2R3A gene.
Protein phosphatase 2 (formerly named type 2A) is one of the four major Ser/Thr phosphatases and is implicated in the negative control of cell growth and division. Protein phosphatase 2 holoenzymes are heterotrimeric proteins composed of a structural subunit A, a catalytic subunit C, and a regulatory subunit B. The regulatory subunit is encoded by a diverse set of genes that have been grouped into the B/PR55, B'/PR61, and B''/PR72 families. These different regulatory subunits confer distinct enzymatic specificities and intracellular localizations to the holozenzyme. The product of this gene belongs to the B'' family. The B'' family has been further divided into subfamilies. The product of this gene belongs to the alpha subfamily of regulatory subunit B''. Alternative splicing results in multiple transcript variants encoding different isoforms.

Interactions
PPP2R3A has been shown to interact with CDC6 and PPP2R4.

References

Further reading